Pilibhit Lok Sabha constituency is one of the 80 Lok Sabha (parliamentary) constituencies in Uttar Pradesh state in northern India.

Assembly segments
Pilibhit Lok Sabha constituency comprises five Vidhan Sabha (legislative assembly) segments. These are;

In the first parliamentary election, the Praja Socialist Party (PSP) won this seat thrice. Later, in the following elections, Indian National Congress (INC) and its participatory parties have won this seat four times. From 1989 onwards, Menaka Gandhi (a member of Nehru-Gandhi family) has kept this seat under her influence. She has won this seat by contesting on the tickets of different parties or independently. The Bharatiya Janata Party (BJP) won Pilibhit parliamentary constituency in 1991 parliamentary elections defeating Janata Dal's Maneka Gandhi, in the Ayodhya wave aftermath; by 2004, Menaka Gandhi had joined BJP and she won this seat that year on BJP's ticket. She contested successfully from Aonla in 2009 but returned to Pilibhit in 2014. Pilibhit parliamentary constituency is one of a few constituencies in India, which have sent a woman to the Indian Parliament for more than five times.

2009 election
In the 2009 general election, BJP decided Varun Gandhi as its candidate from Pilibhit constituency instead of his mother Menaka Gandhi. Pilibhit constituency caught national and international attention due to highly dramatic political condition in the constituency. Total 13,08,959 voters used their rights out of total 13,42,590 voters in the election held on 13 May 2009. Varun Gandhi won this parliamentary seat by receiving 4,19,539 votes and defeating his closest opponent V.M. Singh by 2,81,501 votes. The 
security deposits of all other 15 candidates, including his uncle V.M. Singh of INC, and Bahujan Samaj Party nominee Ganga Charan Rajput was forfeited.

Members of Parliament

Election Results

2019 elections

2014 elections

2009 elections

2004 elections

1999 elections

References

External links
Pilibhit lok sabha  constituency election 2019 result details

Lok Sabha constituencies in Uttar Pradesh
Pilibhit district